John Bingham (1815–1900), was a U.S. politician and judge

John Bingham may refer also to:

Sportspeople
John Bingham (cricketer) (1864–1946), Australian cricketer
John Bingham (English footballer) (born 1949), English footballer
John Bingham (Gaelic footballer), Louth defender
John Bingham (runner) (born 1948), US long-distance runner and author

Other
John Bingham (MP for Tuam, 1739–1760)
John Bingham, 1st Baron Clanmorris (1762–1821), Irish MP for Tuam, 1798–1800
John Bingham, 5th Baron Clanmorris (1852–1916), Irish peer
John Bingham, 7th Baron Clanmorris (1908–1988), Irish peer, secret agent, and novelist
John Bingham, 7th Earl of Lucan (1934–after 1974), British peer and suspected murderer, popularly known as Lord Lucan
John Bingham (fl. 1416–1420), MP for Nottingham
John Bingham (loyalist) (1953–1986), Ulster Volunteer Force member
John Bingham (Roundhead) (1615–1673), English politician who sat in the House of Commons between 1645 and 1659
John Bingham (pianist) (1942–2003), British classical pianist
Sir John Bingham, 1st Baronet of the Bingham baronets
Sir John Bingham, 5th Baronet (1690–1749), Irish MP for Mayo 1727–1749
Sir John Bingham, 6th Baronet (1728–1750), his son, Irish MP for Mayo 1749–1750

See also
J. B. Morton or John Bingham Morton (1893–1979), English writer and columnist
Bingham (surname)